Bagar, also Bagad (बागड़) and even Bar, a term meaning the "dry country", refers to the sandy tract of north-western India and eastern parts of current Pakistan bordering India. For example, area north and south of Ravi river between Chenab river and Sutlej is called Ihang Bar.

Etymology 
Bagar means the prairie (grazing shrubs and grassland) of northern Rajputana, which likely comes from eponymous Arabic word "bagar" meaning "cow" (sacred to Hindus), derived from the Arabic word "cattle".  Baggara in Arabic means "cattle herders". Bagar tract refers to the semi-arid semi-fertile rain-fed sandy shrubby grassland tract at the confluence of arid Thar Desert and fertile bangar and khadir areas of Indo-Gangetic Plain, which as historically inhabited by the cattle herders who remained semi-nomadic until they began to adapt to settled life in the mid to late Medieval Period. Before the adoption of the Arabic name bagar, the area was earlier known as Jangladesh during the Vedic era of Mahabharata and even in early medieval times at least until the end of Hindu reign of Prithviraj Chauhan.

Rājputāna, meaning "Land of the Rajputs", is a historic term for a region in India that includes mainly the present-day Indian state of Rajasthan, parts of Madhya Pradesh and Gujarat, as well as adjoining areas of Punjab and Haryana, and some adjoining areas of Sindh in modern-day southern Pakistan. It lies to the west of the Aravalli Hills, and was earlier known as Samarkand, the earlier form of Registan, before it came to be known as Rajputana, early in the Medieval Period. The name was later adopted by British government as the Rajputana Agency for its dependencies in the region of the present-day Indian state of Rājasthān, which comprised 18 princely states, two chiefships and the British district of Ajmer-Merwara, which was renamed to "Rajasthan" in 1949.

Bagri people 

The term Bagri people was originally applied to the Hindu Jats, Gurjars and Rajputs, such as Bagri Jat and Bagri bishnoi sub caste but now also applied to Bishnoi Jats one of the sections of Agarwal Banias and Maheshwari banias as well as Badhik ("butcher"), Pardhi ("hunter") and Bawariya (semi-nomads) castes. Prominent bagri people include was politician from Haryana
Mani Ram Bagri (1 January 1920 – 31 March 2012, a politician from Haryana), Raj Bagri, Baron Bagri (24 August 1930 – 26 April 2017, India-born British businessman and a Conservative member of the House of Lords from 1997 to 2010, who was made a life peer in 1997).

Bagri language 

Bagri people of the sandy dry Bagar tract speak the Bagri language (बागड़ी), a dialect of overlapping Rajasthani language, Haryanvi language and Punjabi language of the Indo-Aryan family, spoken by about five million speakers.

Bagri region 
Bagri region or tract is long strip of shifting sand dunes called tibba (टिब्बा) and relatively semi-fertile lands between them called lal (लाळ ) along the western border of Haryana and eastern border of Rajasthan.

The Bagar region has potentially very fertile alluvial soil interspersed with highly permeable very sandy tracts in several places with water table more than 100 feet below ground containing brackish water usually unfit for human consumption, where dust storms frequent during the warm summer months from April till the end of July when monsoon arrives. Previously the tract was solely based on the rain and irrigation was possible only in the small area of Bagar region in districts of Fatehabad, Sirsa, Hanumangarh and Sriganganagar where the season Ghaggar river flows. After the opening of Bhakra Nangal Dam canal system in 1963 as well as the earlier Western Yamuna Canal now irrigate most of Haryana including all of the Bagar region falling in Haryana on its western border. Opening of Indira Gandhi Canal in 1983 brought the water of Sutlej and Beas rivers to the fields of Rajasthan including its Bagar tract stabilizing the sand dunes and soil erosion by preventing the expansion of desert.

In Haryana, it covers southern parts of Sirsa district (earlier known as Bhattiana), and western villages of Fatehabad, Hisar, Bhiwani and Charkhi Dadri districts.

In Rajasthan, it covers parts of tehsils of Ganganagar; Bhadra, Nohar in Hanumangarh district; Taranagar tehsil in Churu district.

In Punjab (India), bagar tract covers Fazilka district and southern villages of Muktsar district.

In Punjab, Pakistan, Bagri as minor language is spoken in Bahawalpur and Bahawalnagar district, though these are not considered parts of Bagar tract.

Gallery

See also 

 Barani, Nehri, Nalli
 Bhattiana
 Chak (village)
 Deshwali dialect
 Dhani (settlement type)
 Doab
 Jangladesh
 Johad
 Khadir and Bangar
 Punjab region
 Divisions of Haryana

References 

Regions of Haryana
Regions of Punjab, India
Regions of Rajasthan
Regions of Punjab, Pakistan